Hygor Guimarães Gonçalves (born 5 January 1989), known as just Hygor, is a Brazilian professional footballer who plays as a midfielder for KF Vllaznia Shkodër in the Albanian First Division.

References

1989 births 
Living people
Association football midfielders
Brazilian footballers
KF Vllaznia Shkodër players
Kategoria Superiore players
Brazilian expatriate footballers
Expatriate footballers in Albania
Brazilian expatriate sportspeople in Albania